Busacca is a surname. Notable people with the surname include:

Ciccio Busacca (1925–1989), Italian ballad singer
Helle Busacca (1915–1996), Italian poet, painter, and writer
Massimo Busacca (born 1969), Swiss football referee

Italian-language surnames